The 2019 Décastar was the 43rd edition of the annual two-day track and field meeting for combined track and field events. It took place on 22 and 23 June 2019 in Talence, France. The competition, featuring a decathlon (men) and a heptathlon (women) event, was part of the 2019 IAAF World Combined Events Challenge.

Men's decathlon

Schedule

22 June

23 June

Results

Women's heptathlon

Schedule

22 June

23 June

Results

References
 Men's results
 Women's results

2019
Decastar
Decastar